Hurricane Arlene was the first tropical cyclone of the 1963 Atlantic hurricane season and one of the wettest storms ever recorded in Bermuda. Originating from a tropical depression on July 31, Arlene quickly intensified into a Category 2 hurricane on August 2. After attaining this intensity, the storm quickly weakened and turned west. By August 4, Arlene had degenerated into a tropical depression. The storm failed to re-organize until August 7, by which time it restrengthened into a tropical storm. The following day, Arlene re-attained hurricane-status before passing directly over Bermuda. Several hours after passing the island, it reached its peak intensity with winds of 115 mph (160 km/) and a barometric pressure of 969 mbar (hPa). By August 11, Arlene transitioned into an extratropical cyclone before being absorbed by another cyclone later that day.

Along its track, several hurricane warnings and watches were issued for the Leeward Islands; however, no damage was reported on any of the islands. The storm has its greatest impact in Bermuda where high winds and near-record rainfall downed trees, power lines and caused flooding. Damages across the island amounted to $300,000 (1963 USD; $2.1 million 2009 USD).

Meteorological history

Hurricane Arlene was first identified as a tropical depression on July 31 between the Lesser Antilles and the Cape Verde Islands by the TIROS VI satellite. The large cyclone, estimated at five degrees in diameter, steadily tracked westward and eventually northwestward and intensified into a tropical storm on August 2. Later that day, a Navy reconnaissance aircraft reached the storm and found a clear eye and a barometric pressure of 987 mbar (hPa), resulting in Arlene being classified a hurricane. This meant that the storm had rapidly intensified from a tropical depression to a hurricane within the span of 18 hours.

Early on August 3, Arlene began to weaken as it turned towards the west once more. The storm continued to slowly weaken before rapidly degenerating into a tropical depression on August 4. The quick decrease in intensity was the result of a sudden increase in vertical wind shear near the core of the cyclone. Later that day, the system passed near the northern Leeward Islands; however, the depression was poorly organized. The former hurricane steadily tracked northwestward and began to regenerate on August 7.

As the storm began to reorganize, the forward motion had become virtually stationary but later began to increase as Arlene turned northeastward, beginning recurvature into the main belt of the Westerlies. Ships in the vicinity of the depression reported that it had regained gale-force winds on August 8, resulting in advisories on Arlene being re-initiated around that time. Later that day, a Navy reconnaissance plane found hurricane-force winds around the center of the storm, resulting in Arlene being upgraded to a minimal hurricane a second time.

The storm continued to intensify after passing the island, with reconnaissance recorded a minimum pressure of 969 mbar (hPa) and maximum winds reached . The hurricane began to weaken hours later, with winds decreasing below  by the afternoon of August 10. Shortly after, Arlene transitioned into an extratropical cyclone, while maintaining hurricane-force winds, over the north Atlantic. The remnants were absorbed by a larger cyclone near Newfoundland on August 11.

Preparations and impact

On August 3, the National Weather Service in San Juan, Puerto Rico issued hurricane warnings for the northern Leeward Islands and a hurricane watch for the Virgin Islands. Later that day, the watch was expanded to include Puerto Rico. By August 4, the hurricane warnings were lowered to gale warnings and the watch was discontinued as Arlene weakened to a tropical storm. Later that day, all warnings were canceled since the storm had further weakened to a tropical depression. On August 8, after Arlene regenerated, residents in Bermuda were advised to not venture offshore on any vessel and rush all hurricane preparations to completion.

Tree limbs and power lines were downed across the island, a few small boats sank in rough seas and flooding was reported in some areas. In all, damage in Bermuda amounted to $300,000 (1963 USD; $2.1 million 2009 USD).

See also

List of Bermuda hurricanes
1963 Atlantic hurricane season

References

External links
Monthly Weather Review for 1963
Preliminary Report for Hurricane Arlene

1963 Atlantic hurricane season
Cape Verde hurricanes
Category 3 Atlantic hurricanes
Hurricanes in Bermuda